"93 'til Infinity" is a song by American hip-hop group Souls of Mischief. It was released in 1993 as the second single from their debut album of the same name. It was their only single to ever chart on the US Billboard Hot 100, reaching number 72.

Background and writing
The backing track was composed through usage of samples from Billy Cobham's 1974 "Heather", a song from his album Crosswinds. A-Plus told XXL that he created the song, originally titled "91 'til Infinity", when the group was still in high school. He indicated that the song was originally a "slower, more somber beat" and that it was emotional after writing and rapping to the group members. A-Plus went on to say that he originally gave the beat to Pep Love and then took it back when they began working on their debut studio album.

Music video
The video was directed by Michael Lucero and was filmed in numerous locations, including Yosemite National Park.

Track listing
12", CD, Vinyl
"93 'til Infinity" (LP Version) - 4:46
"93 'til Infinity" (Remix) - 4:40 
"93 'til Infinity" (LP Instrumental) - 4:48
"93 'til Infinity" (Remix Instrumental) - 4:40
"Disseshowedo" - 3:59

Charts

Certifications

References

External links
93 'til Infinity Single on Discogs

1993 singles
1993 songs
American hip hop songs
Jive Records singles
Song recordings produced by A-Plus (rapper)